Hanna Slak (born 1975, Warsaw, Poland) is a Slovenian - German film director and screenwriter.

In 2017, Slak's film Rudar (The Miner) was selected as the Slovenian entry for the Best Foreign Language Film at the 90th Academy Awards.

References

1975 births
Living people
Slovenian women film directors
Slovenian screenwriters